The 1877 Rutgers Queensmen football team represented Rutgers University in the 1877 college football season. The team compiled a 1–2 record and outscored their opponents, 6 to 5. The team had no coach, and its captain for the second consecutive year was Andrew Raymond.

Schedule

References

Rutgers
Rutgers Scarlet Knights football seasons
Rutgers Queensmen football